James T. Leavins (born July 28, 1960) is a Canadian former professional ice hockey player who played 41 games in the National Hockey League for the Detroit Red Wings and New York Rangers during the 1985–86 and 1986–7 seasons. The rest of his career, which lasted from 1984 to 1995, was spent in various minor leagues.

On July 29, 1986, the Detroit Red Wings traded Leavins to the New York Rangers (along with Kelly Kisio, Lane Lambert, and a fifth round draft choice), in exchange for goalie Glen Hanlon and two future draft picks.

He was an all WCHA and all-American player at the University of Denver

Career statistics

Regular season and playoffs

Awards and honours

References

External links
 

1960 births
Living people
Adirondack Red Wings players
Canadian expatriate ice hockey players in Italy
Canadian expatriate ice hockey players in Finland
Canadian expatriate ice hockey players in Sweden
Canadian expatriate ice hockey players in the United States
Canadian ice hockey defencemen
Denver Pioneers men's ice hockey players
Detroit Red Wings players
Färjestad BK players
Fort Wayne Komets players
HC Varese players
Ice hockey people from Saskatchewan
KooKoo players
New Haven Nighthawks players
New York Rangers players
Regina Pats players
Salt Lake Golden Eagles (IHL) players
Undrafted National Hockey League players